Lilian Roughley (born 1949), best known as Lill Roughley, is an English actress who has appeared on British television since the 1970s. Her notable roles include Alice in the first series of Mulberry, and as Ella Dawkins in My Hero. In the 1980s and 1990s, Roughley also worked often with Victoria Wood, playing a variety of roles in Wood's various comedy series for the BBC.

Career
Lilian Roughley was born 1949 in Prescot, Lancashire. She had minor roles in the 1970s and 1980s in programmes including All the Fun of the Fair, Tales of the Unexpected, Victoria Wood: As Seen on TV, Bergerac and Inspector Morse. She worked with Victoria Wood again in 1989, appearing in four of her six comedy plays for television, and again in 1992's Victoria Wood's All Day Breakfast. Also in 1992 she played Alice in the first series of Mulberry. In the following years Roughley appeared in Minder, A Touch of Frost, the film Brassed Off, Hetty Wainthropp Investigates, Dinnerladies (a further collaboration with Victoria Wood), Absolutely Fabulous (in the 2001 episode of the series, called "Small Opening", as the "actress" portraying Edina in the play written by Saffron, based on her own life) and Heartbeat. Roughley played Lorraine Thomson in one episode of Coronation Street, which aired on 17 May 1996. She also played the sexually voracious landlady, Mrs Best, in the BBC Radio 4 sitcom Hut 33 (2007–2009).

Roughley is probably best known for playing Ella Dawkins in the sitcom My Hero, from 2000 to 2006.

Personal life
Roughley has been married to William Parry since 1971 and they have three children together.

Filmography

References

External links

English film actresses
English television actresses
Living people
1949 births